Seth Eugene Christian (born August 8, 1980) is an American film director, writer and cinematographer. His work includes an Oscar-qualifying film, Radley (2021), and award-winning short films Discover Kasper (2013), Salvation Jane (2014) and Sticks (2015). He was a producer on Echo Boomers, which was picked up by Saban and Universal. He has worked with actors such as: Bruce Willis, Patrick Schwarzenegger, Michael Shannon, Thomas Jane, Trace Atkins, Tom Berenger, Lesley Ann Warren, Mike Tyson and more.

Early life and education
Christian grew up in Seward and Lincoln, Nebraska. When he moved to Omaha NE, where he pursued the music industry as a singer song-writer. Later, He moved from Omaha, Nebraska to Nashville, Tennessee in 2001, where he started the rock band Ready Empire as guitarist and lead vocalist. He has also performed as a solo musician.

In 2006, he graduated from the Middle Tennessee State University with a Bachelor of Arts in mass communications. He studied 3D animation and photography.

Career
Christian has garnered over 30 nominations world-wide for various film awards including: Best Thriller for Sticks, Best Drama for Discover Kasper from Los Angeles' Pasadena International Film Festival as well as Best Director, Best Short Film and Director's Choice Award from the Red Dirt International Film Festival, Emerging Artist of the Year Award from the Twister Alley Film Festival and the Audience Choice Award for Sticks at the Highland Park Independent Film Festival and Best Short Film at the London Digital Film Festival.

Besides being a successful Director of Photography and Gaffer in the film industry for films such as: Vendetta (starring Bruce Willis and Mike Tyson), Desperate Riders (starring Tom Berenger), Seth was also one of the producers on the Universal/Saban film starring Michael Shannon and Patrick Schwartzenegger, Echo Boomers. Christian also has also served as Director, Cinematographer or gaffer on many music videos for artists such as: Jewel, Clint Black, Gavin DeGraw, ZZ Top, Lady A, as well as various other projects like The Last Jar, Epic Fail series, commercials, corporate promos, voice-overs and graphic designs.

References

Living people
Middle Tennessee State University alumni
1976 births
People from Seward, Nebraska
People from Lincoln, Nebraska
People from Omaha, Nebraska
People from Nashville, Tennessee
Film directors from Tennessee
Film directors from Nebraska